In the context of particle displacement and velocity, a sound particle is an imaginary infinitesimal volume of a medium that shares the movement of the medium in response to the presence of sound at a specified point or in a specified region.  Sound particles are not molecules in the physical or chemical sense; they do not have defined physical or chemical properties or the temperature-dependent kinetic behavior of ordinary molecules.  Sound particles are, then, indefinitely small (small compared to the wavelength of sound) so that their movement truly represents the movement of the medium in their locality.  They exist in the mind’s eye to enable this movement to be visualized and described quantitatively.  Assuming the medium as a whole to be at rest, sound particles are imagined to vibrate about fixed points.

See also
Sound
Particle displacement 
Particle velocity
Particle acceleration

References

Acoustics